Tanaidomorpha is a suborder of malacostracan crustacean.

References 

Tanaidacea
Crustaceans described in 1980